TT Toys Toys SRL are an Italian manufacturer of children’s pedal and electric ride on cars. They have a factory near Milan and specialise in the manufacture of licensed replica cars for children.

History
Alberto Burratti, Luigi Vezzoli, Carlo Boselli and Pietro Pandini founded Toys Toys in 1978 in Tribiano near Milan. The founders came from a specialist vacuum-forming factory and wanted to apply this knowledge to the toy world. The company built up a number of partnerships with major car-manufacturers and with entertainment companies (such as Walt Disney).

In 1997 Toys Toys joined the Berchet Group.

The partnership with Berchet allowed Toys Toys to increase product range and encourage a direct presence in Italy. However Berchet began to suffer from financial difficulty and so in 2005 was acquired by rival company Smoby. Smoby used its vast network of global distributors to catapult Toys Toys products across the world. However Smoby themselves then fell into financial troubles and despite an attempt by MGA to save the company, they eventually fell into the French equivalent of bankruptcy and their CEO was arrested. Therefore, in 2007 the Toys Toys bosses decided to acquire the company via a management buy-out, and continued to remain independent even after Simba-Dickie revived Smoby.

Toys Toys enjoyed a few years of growth as it built up its own network of distributors around the world, however was badly hit by the global recession that began at the end of 2007. Toys Toys did survive the crisis, but in 2010 agreed to acquisition by the Italian company WICE Group, which has given the company extra security.

Products
Toys Toys primarily focus on the manufacture of licensed ride-on cars for children. The company works with the relevant manufacturer’s designers to recreates the adult car in child size.

Despite the focus on licensed cars, Toys Toys have experimented with non-branded ride-ons as well. They manufactured a petrol powered Freester that later became a 24v. The latest 2010 catalogue includes a range of ‘baby’ pedal cars which are smaller and cheaper than their licensed products.

Licenses
Toys Toys hold licenses for a variety of sports car brands as well as licenses for more mainstream cars.

Toys Toys have always been very picky about what licenses they accept, agreeing to only manufacturer popular and prestigious cars. In 2009 the managers turned down offers to manufacturer licensed cars for Aston Martin and Bentley.

Distributing Countries
 Italy – MacDue
 France – Tbd
 Germany – R.Brehm GMBH
 Spain – Tbd
 Portugal – Tbd
 United Kingdom – Exclusive Toys
 Ukraine - Alimpex Group
 Switzerland – Tbd

References

Toy companies of Italy
Toy brands
Toy companies established in 1978
Italian companies established in 1978